Durlacher is a surname. Notable people with the surname include:

Alfred Durlacher (1818–1869), Australian explorer
Doris Durlacher (Miriam Dorothy Durlacher, 1870–1942), nurse and midwife in Toodyay, Western Australia
Elcan Durlacher (1817–1889), translator and publisher
Jessica Durlacher (born 1961), Dutch literary critic, columnist and novelist
Laurence Durlacher (1904–1986), Royal Navy admiral
Lewis Durlacher (1792–1864), surgeon-chiropodist to the British royal household 
Lindsey Durlacher (1974–2011), American Greco-Roman wrestler
Ludwig Durlacher a.k.a. Louis Attila (1844–1924), German-born American strongman
Montague Durlacher (1824–1894), who succeeded his father Lewis as chiropodist to the British royal household 
Patrick Durlacher (1903–1971), English cricketer
Ruth Durlacher, Irish tennis player around 1900